Thomas Lynn Bristowe (31 March 1833 – 6 June 1892) was an English stockbroker and  Conservative Party politician

Biography

Bristowe was the third son of John Syer Bristowe, a doctor of Camberwell, and his wife Mary Chesshyre of Rock Savage, Cheshire. He was educated privately and became a stockbroker. He was a partner in the firm of Bristowe Brothers of the London Stock Exchange.
 
In 1885 Bristowe was elected Member of Parliament for Norwood. Bristowe was very active in a campaign to raise funds to restore Brockwell Hall, a part of Brockwell Park which had come into the ownership of Lambeth Council. However, he died of a heart attack on the steps of Brockwell Hall during the grand opening ceremony in June 1892, aged 59.

Bristowe married Frances Ellen Mason in 1857. They lived at Dulwich Hill House, Denmark Hill, Surrey. Bristowe was buried at the West Norwood Cemetery.

References

1833 births
1892 deaths
Conservative Party (UK) MPs for English constituencies
UK MPs 1885–1886
UK MPs 1886–1892
Burials at West Norwood Cemetery